Kazakhstan competed at the 2012 Summer Olympics in London, from 27 July to 12 August 2012. This was the nation's fifth appearance at the Summer Olympics in the post-Soviet era.

National Olympic Committee of the Republic of Kazakhstan sent a total of 115 athletes to the Games, 74 men and 41 women, to compete in 16 sports. The nation's team size was roughly 15 athletes smaller compared to the team sent to Beijing, and had the second largest share of men in its Summer Olympic history. Men's water polo was the only team-based sport in which Kazakhstan was represented in these Olympic Games. Among the sports played by the athletes, Kazakhstan marked its official Olympic debut in tennis.

Kazakhstan left London with a total of 13 medals (7 gold, 1 silver, and 5 bronze), finishing twelfth in the overall medal standings. This was the nation's most successful Olympics with the most gold medals, surpassing its previous records obtained in Atlanta and in Sydney where the nation had won three golds. Four of these medals were awarded to the athletes in weightlifting, which is Kazakhstan's most powerful Olympic sport along with boxing. Among the nation's medalists were weightlifter Ilya Ilin, who managed to defend his Olympic title from Beijing, and triple jumper Olga Rypakova, who became the second Kazakh track and field athlete to win the gold after 12 years. Professional cyclist Alexander Vinokourov, who competed at his fourth Olympics since 1996, won Kazakhstan's first ever gold medal in the men's road race. In 2016, following a series of positive drugs tests found during retests of 2012 samples, Kazakhstani athletes were stripped of a series of medals, including all four golds in weightlifting.

Medalists

| width="78%" align="left" valign="top" |

| width="22%" align="left" valign="top" |

Disqualified medalists

Archery

Kazakhstan qualified two archers.

Athletics

Kazakh athletes have so far achieved qualifying standards in the following athletics events (up to a maximum of 3 athletes in each event at the 'A' Standard, and 1 at the 'B' Standard):

Men
Track & road events

Field events

Combined events – Decathlon

Women
Track & road events

Field events

Combined events – Heptathlon

Boxing

Kazakhstan has qualified the following boxers.

Men

Women

Canoeing

Slalom

Sprint
Kazakhstan has qualified boats for the following events.

Qualification Legend: FA = Qualify to final (medal); FB = Qualify to final B (non-medal)

Cycling

Kazakhstan has qualified cyclists for the following events.

Road

Kazakhstan was given two spots in the men's road race, subsequently filled by Assan Bazayev and Alexander Vinokourov. While Bazayev was a newcomer, Vinokourov was not a stranger to the Olympics as he had competed in 1996, 2000, and 2004. Vinokourov was expected to place well, as he had won silver in the men's road race at the 2000 Summer Olympics in Sydney. A large breakaway – which at its peak contained 32 riders – formed off the front of the peloton early on in the race. Alexander Vinokourov was not a part of the initial move, but he joined later on in the race. The peloton, led by the Great Britain Team, kept the breakaway relatively close for the latter  of the race. However, as the race came to its close, the peloton could not close the gap to the large leading breakaway. It was clear that the breakaway would contain the eventual winner, and as the breakaway went under  to go in the race, the riders began to attack. Vinokourov and Rigoberto Urán were the first two riders to mount a sizeable distance between the main breakaway and themselves. As Urán and Vinokourov worked together to stay away, the main breakaway didn't work collectively to pull back the two leading riders. With around 200 meters to go in the race, Urán swept across to the left side of the road and Vinokourov attacked. Vinokourov beat out Urán to win the race and ultimately the gold medal. Bazayev crossed the line in forty-third place while in the peloton.

Fencing

Kazakhstan has qualified 3 fencers.
Men

Women

Gymnastics

Artistic
Men

Women

Rhythmic

Judo

Men

Women

Modern pentathlon

Kazakhstan has qualified 2 men.

Rowing

Kazakhstan has qualified the following boats.

Men

Women

Qualification Legend: FA=Final A (medal); FB=Final B (non-medal); FC=Final C (non-medal); FD=Final D (non-medal); FE=Final E (non-medal); FF=Final F (non-medal); SA/B=Semifinals A/B; SC/D=Semifinals C/D; SE/F=Semifinals E/F; QF=Quarterfinals; R=Repechage

Shooting

Kazakhstan has ensured a three quotas in shooting.

Men

Women

Swimming

Kazakh swimmers have so far achieved qualifying standards in the following events (up to a maximum of 2 swimmers in each event at the Olympic Qualifying Time (OQT), and potentially 1 at the Olympic Selection Time (OST)):

Men

Women

Synchronized swimming

Kazakhstan has qualified 2 quota places in synchronized swimming.

Taekwondo

Kazakhstan has qualified the following quota places.

Tennis

Water polo

Kazakhstan has qualified a men's team
 Men's event – 1 team of 13 players

Men's tournament

Team roster

Group play

Weightlifting

Kazakhstan has qualified 10 weightlifters in the Olympics, 6 men and 4 women. The team later reduced to 8 athletes after two weightlifters Arli Chontei and Farkhad Kharki, both born in China, reportedly withdrew from the Games because of citizenship issues.

In 2016, all four Kazakh weightlifting gold medals were disqualified, and their medals and records stripped, following retests of 2012 samples returned positive doping results.

Men

Women

Wrestling

Kazakhstan has qualified the following quota places.

Men's freestyle

Men's Greco-Roman

Women's freestyle

References

Summer Olympics
Nations at the 2012 Summer Olympics
2012